Raber is an unincorporated community in Jefferson Township, Whitley County, in the U.S. state of Indiana.

History
Raber was named after Samuel Raber, an early settler.

A post office was established at Raber in 1884 and remained in operation until 1902.

Geography

References

Unincorporated communities in Whitley County, Indiana
Unincorporated communities in Indiana
Fort Wayne, IN Metropolitan Statistical Area